Elsar Rodas Mendoza (born 28 February 1994) is a Peruvian footballer who plays for Club Deportivo Universidad César Vallejo.

Honours 
Los Caimanes
Winner
 Peruvian Segunda División: 2013

References

External links 
 

1994 births
Living people
Peruvian footballers
Association football defenders
Atlético Minero footballers
Los Caimanes footballers
Sporting Cristal footballers
Club Deportivo Universidad César Vallejo footballers
Peruvian Primera División players
Peruvian Segunda División players
Footballers at the 2015 Pan American Games
Pan American Games competitors for Peru